Werneria submontana is a species of toad in the family Bufonidae. It is endemic to western Cameroon and is known from Mount Kupe and the Bakossi Mountains. It has been found in association with rivers (under rocks in a partly dried-up river basin, and on stony ground among low vegetation in the spray zone of a small, artificial waterfall). The species can be locally abundant but is threatened by habitat loss. Parts of its range receive protection from the Bakossi Forest Reserve.

References

submontana
Frogs of Africa
Amphibians of Cameroon
Endemic fauna of Cameroon
Amphibians described in 2004
Taxa named by Wolfgang Böhme (herpetologist)
Taxa named by Olivier Sylvain Gérard Pauwels
Taxonomy articles created by Polbot